Giovanni Battista Costanzi (1704-1778) was an Italian composer and cellist. He succeeded Stefano Fabri as maestro di cappella of the Cappella Giulia at St. Peter's Basilica in Rome.
Also known as teacher of Luigi Boccherini, to him is dedicated the opera house main theatre in Rome.

Recordings
 Cantata per Natale, soloists, Gambe di legno, Fra Bernardo.
 Sonate per violoncello. Giovanni Sollima; Monika Leskovar. Arianna Art Ensemble. Glossa.

References

Italian Baroque composers
1704 births
1778 deaths
Italian Classical-period composers
18th-century Italian composers
18th-century Italian male musicians